Zaher is a surname. Notable people with the surname include:

Ahmed Zaher (born 1989), Egyptian trap shooter
Hamed Shami Zaher (born 1984), Qatari footballer
Hamid Zaher (born 1974), Canadian-based Afghan writer and gay rights activist
Ibrahim Zaher (born 1982), Egyptian water polo player
Islam Zaher (born 1972), Egyptian artist
Julia Zaher, Israeli Arab businessperson, philanthropist, and schoolteacher
Mike Zaher (born 1985), American footballer